The Canadian Organ Replacement Registry (CORR) is a health organization started by Canadian nephrologists and kidney transplant surgeons in 1985 in order to develop the care of patients with kidney failure. In the early 1990s data on liver and heart transplantation were added to the registry. In 1995, CORR entered into an agreement with the Canadian Institute of Health Information to house the registry in CIHI. The board of directors of CORR receives advice from its scientific advisory committee. In recent years a research subcommittee was formed to promote research using data from the registry.

Leadership
Current and past Chairs of the CORR Board of Directors are listed below:

 1985–1992 John Jeffrey
 1992–1999 Paul Greig
 1999–2004 Vivian McAlister
 2004–2006 Stanley Fenton
 2006–2008 Joanne Kappel
 2008–2010 John Gill

References

External links
CORR website
CIHI website

Medical and health organizations based in Canada
Organizations established in 1985
Organ donation
1985 establishments in Canada